The following is a list of notable people from Greenland:

 Maliina Abelsen, politician and MP for the party Inuit Ataqatigiit
 Naja Abelsen (born 1964), artist, book illustrator
 Arnarsaq, translator, interpreter and missionary
 Arnarulunnguaq (1896–1933), native Greenlandic woman who accompanied Knud Rasmussen on his Fifth Thule Expedition 
  Aron of Kangeq, hunter, painter, and oral historian
 Hermann Berthelsen, politician, affiliated with the Siumut (Forward) party
 Julie Berthelsen, singer-songwriter
 Ove Karl Berthelsen, politician, Minister for Industry and Mineral Resources
 Jørgen Brønlund, explorer, educator, and catechist
 Palle Christiansen, member of the Democrats, Minister for Finance, and Member of the Greenland Government for Nordic Cooperation
 Nukaaka Coster-Waldau, singer, actress, and former Miss Greenland
 Agnethe Davidsen, first female government minister in Greenland
 Aviâja Egede Lynge (born 1974), indigenous rights activist, childhood rights commissioner
 Hans Enoksen, politician, fourth prime minister
 Agathe Fontain, politician, Minister for Health
 Anthon Frederiksen, leader of the Democrats, Minister for Housing, Infrastructure and Transport, and Deputy-Premier
 Jesper Grønkjær, professional footballer
 Ole Jørgen Hammeken,  explorer and social worker
 Ane Hansen, politician, Minister for Fisheries, Hunting and Agriculture
 Hans Hendrik, Arctic traveller and interpreter
 Aki-Matilda Høegh-Dam (born 1996), politician, member of the Folketing, Siumut party
 Arnannguaq Høegh (1956–2020), graphic artist and educator
 Doris J. Jensen (born 1978), politician, member of the Siumut party
 Lars Emil Johansen, former prime minister
 Ricky Enø Jørgensen, racing cyclist for Glud & Marstrand Horsens
 Mimi Karlsen, politician, Minister for Culture, Education, Research and Church Affairs
 Jessie Kleemann (born 1959), poet, performance artist
 Kuupik Kleist, politician
 Makka Kleist (born 1951), actress
 Nina Kreutzmann Jørgensen (born 1977), singer
 Angunnguaq Larsen, actor (Borgen)
 Thorkell Leifsson, son of Leif Ericson, paramount chieftain of Greenland
 Rasmus Lerdorf, creator of the PHP programming language
 Henrik Lund, lyricist, painter and priest
 Aqqaluk Lynge, former president of the Inuit Circumpolar Council
Nauja Lynge (born 1965), writer, lecturer
 Jonathan Motzfeldt, former prime minister
 Josef Motzfeldt, politician and serves as Minister for Finance and Foreign Affairs
 Asii Chemnitz Narup, politician and MP for the party Inuit Ataqatigiit
 Anders Olsen, trader and colonial administrator
 Maligiaq Padilla, famous kayaker
 Lena Pedersen, Canadian politician and social worker
 Johan Carl Christian Petersen, seaman and interpreter
 Gertrud Rask, wife of missionary Hans Egede and mother of Paul
 Knud Rasmussen, polar explorer and anthropologist
 Henriette Rasmussen (1950–2017), educator, journalist, women's rights activist and politician
 Signe Rink (1836–1909), writer and ethnologist
 Lars Rosing, actor, brother of film director Otto
 Otto Rosing, film director, brother of actor Lars
 Augusta Salling, politician, former finance minister
 Minik Wallace, brought as a child in 1897 to New York by Robert Peary
 Karla Jessen Williamson, Executive Director of the Arctic Institute of North America

People
Greenland